"The Turbulence Expert" is a short story by Stephen King, first published in the 2018 horror anthology Flight or Fright.

Plot summary 
While eating dinner in Boston, Craig Dixon - a "turbulence expert" - receives a phone call from his "facilitator", who instructs him to join a flight from Boston to Sarasota later that evening. Dixon reluctantly agrees; he considers running but is convinced his employer will catch him and potentially execute him. On the flight, Dixon is seated between Mary Worth, an elderly widowed librarian, and Frank Freeman, a gruff businessman. Dixon experiences severe apprehension about the flight. He reflects on his lifestyle, which includes a high salary and living in high-class hotels.

As the plane passes over South Carolina, it encounters a severe patch of clear-air turbulence. Dixon closes his eyes and experiences a vivid vision of the plane crashing, after which the plane rights itself. Worth tells Dixon that she was sure the plane was going to crash, saying "I saw it".

In Sarasota, Dixon is met by a stretch limousine that will take him to a hotel. After seeing Worth standing on the curb, he offers her a lift to Siesta Key. During the journey, Dixon explains to her that he works for an unnamed organization that is capable of predicting clear-air turbulence, which is a far more serious phenomenon than the public believes. "Talented" individuals such as Dixon are required on flights that will encounter clear-air turbulence, with their terror triggering telepathic abilities that prevent the plane from crashing. Remembering that Worth was also terrified and also believed the plane would crash, Dixon invites her to join the organization, privately noting that once she joins she will never be able to leave and that recruiting her will enable him to retire two years earlier.

The story ends with Worth being contacted by Dixon's facilitator, after which she is seen acting as a turbulence expert on a flight from Boston to Dallas.

Publication 
"The Turbulence Expert" was first published in 2018 as part of the 2018 horror anthology Flight or Fright, which was conceived of by King and edited by him along with Bev Vincent. An audiobook was released consecutively by Simon & Schuster Audio, with King narrating his own story.

Reception 
Stephen Spignesi noted that "The Turbulence Expert" represents one of King's occasional forays into science fiction, commenting "he doesn't 'let us down' (pun intended) with his latest effort." Ross Jeffery of STORGY Magazine described "The Turbulence Expert" as "a good story [...] not a great story" and "a simple story that really didn't move me at all". Greg Chapman of the New York Journal of Books stated "like many of King’s short stories, it leaves you guessing—and wanting more".

References

See also
 Stephen King short fiction bibliography

External links 
 "The Turbulence Expert" at StephenKing.com

Short stories by Stephen King
2018 short stories
Horror short stories
Science fiction short stories
Short stories about aviation